Metanarsia is a genus of moths in the family Gelechiidae.

Species
modesta group:
Metanarsia dahurica
Metanarsia kosakewitshi
Metanarsia modesta
Metanarsia mongola
Metanarsia monochroma
Metanarsia onzella
Metanarsia piskunovi
Metanarsia scythiella
junctivittella group:
Metanarsia junctivittella
alphitodes group:
Metanarsia alphitodes
incertella group:
Metanarsia incertella
partilella group:
Metanarsia partilella
unknown species group
Metanarsia amseli
Metanarsia guberlica
Metanarsia trisignella

References

 , 2005: A review of the genus Metanarsia Staudinger, 1871 (Gelechiidae). Nota Lepidopterologica 27 (4): 273—297. Full Article: .
 , 2008, New species and new records of the genus Metanarsia Staudinger, 1871 (Lepidoptera: Gelechiidae) SHILAP Revista de Lepidopterologia 36 (144): 531-538.
 , 2010: The gelechiid fauna of the southern Ural Mountains, part I: descriptions of seventeen new species (Lepidoptera: Gelechiidae). Zootaxa 2366: 1-34. Abstract: http://www.mapress.com/zootaxa/2010/f/z02366p034f.pdf.

 
Apatetrini